The following is a list of buildings designed by English Australian architect John Dalton.

References 

John Dalton (architect)
Dalton